Dharmavaram railway station (station code:DMM) is the primary railway station serving Dharmavaram, Anantapur district. It is one of the major train junctions in Andhra Pradesh. The station comes under the jurisdiction of Guntakal division of South Coast Railways. The station has five platforms.

Originating trains 
At present three services originates from this station, the Vijayawada – Dharmavaram Express. and Dharmavaram-Machilipatnam/Narasapur Express (via Tirupati, Vijayawada Jn., Gudiwada Jn., Bhimavaram Jn.) and Dharamavaram-Bengaluru Memu express

Routes 
The Rajdhani Express & Karnataka Express runs through this line.

References 

Guntakal
Railway junction stations in Andhra Pradesh
Railway stations in Anantapur district